Andriychuk, is a Ukrainian surname derived from a personal name Andriy (Andrew).

 Vasyl Havrylovych Andriychuk, Doctor of Economic Sciences
 Volodymyr Andriyovych Andriychuk, Doctor of Technical Sciences
 Viktor Hryhorovych Andriychuk, Doctor of Economic Sciences
 Ivan Hnatovych Andriychuk, Ukrainian sculptor
 Kesar Omelyanovych Andriychuk, Ukrainian poet
 Mykhailo Mykolayovych Andriychuk, writer and journalist of the United States
 Mykhailo Omelyanovych Andriychuk, Distinguished artist of Ukraine (SSR)
 Tamara Hryhorivna Andriychuk, Distinguished teacher of Ukraine (SSR)

Ukrainian-language surnames
Patronymic surnames